The Bank of San Marino is an institution created  on December 20, 1920, in Faetano, Republic of San Marino.
It was don Eugenio Fabbri, then parish priest in Faetano, who, together with some parishioners, founded the first cooperative association in general partnership of that territory. Until 2001 it was called Rural Bank of Loans and Deposits in Faetano (Cassa Rurale di Depositi e Prestiti di Faetano), then its name was changed to Bank of San Marino (Banca di San Marino SpA ).
 
A first branch was opened in the capital of San Marino in 1974. Today there are 12 branches, with more than 140 employees.
 
It is the parent company of Leasing Sammarinese, Banca Impresa di San Marino, BSM Immobiliare, San Marino Business, Easy Business SpA and Easy Holding SpA.
 
Its total assets are more than 216 million euros; its solvency ratio is more than 20% and the bank provides 23% of the total San Marino bank system capital, according to the 2010 balance sheet data.

Banca di San Marino bought SMIB (San Marino International Bank) in October 2012  and renamed Banca Impresa di San Marino.

The Foundation Ente Cassa di Faetano is the main shareholder of the Bank of San Marino. The Foundation Ente Cassa di Faetano is a non-profit organization which reinvests its profits with the purpose of development in all of the Republic of San Marino.

See also
List of banks in San Marino

References

External links
 Banca di San Marino web site (Italian) 
 Central Bank of San Marino

Economy of San Marino
1920 establishments in San Marino
Banks established in 1920